A title used for the head of a regional council, used in:

 France (Président du conseil régional)
 Italy (Presidente del consiglio regionale)